Michael Joseph O'Leary (29 September 1883 – 12 December 1963) was a New Zealand rugby union player. He was a member of the New Zealand national side, the All Blacks, in 1910 and 1913. He played eight matches for the All Blacks, including four internationals, of which two were as captain against the touring Australian team in 1913.

References

1883 births
1963 deaths
Rugby union players from Masterton
New Zealand rugby union players
New Zealand international rugby union players
Wairarapa rugby union players
Wellington rugby union players
Auckland rugby union players
Rugby union fullbacks
Rugby union centres